The 1985–86 Ohio Bobcats men's basketball team represented Ohio University as a member of the Mid-American Conference in the college basketball season of 1985–86. The team was coached by Danny Nee in his sixth and final season at Ohio. They played their home games at Convocation Center. The Bobcats finished with a record of 22–8 and finished second in MAC regular season with a conference record of 14–4.  They lost in the semifinals of the MAC tournament to Ball State. They received a bid to the Postseason NIT. There they lost to Ohio State in the first round. After the season Danny Nee took the head coaching job at Nebraska. He was replaced by Billy Hahn.

Schedule

|-
!colspan=9 style=|Non-conference regular season

|-
!colspan=12 style=| MAC regular season

|-
!colspan=9 style=| MAC Tournament

|-
!colspan=9 style=| NCAA Tournament

Source:

Statistics

Team Statistics
Final 1985–86 Statistics

Source

Player statistics

Source

References

Ohio Bobcats men's basketball seasons
Ohio
Ohio
Ohio Bobcats men's basketball
Ohio Bobcats men's basketball